Aproaerema coracina is a moth of the family Gelechiidae. It was described by Edward Meyrick in 1921. It is found in Australia, where it has been recorded from Queensland.

The wingspan is about 9 mm. The forewings are dark bronzy fuscous with a minute whitish dot indicating the plical stigma, and one on the tornus. There is a slight white transverse mark on the costa at three-fourths. The hindwings are dark slaty grey.

References

Moths described in 1921
Aproaerema
Moths of Australia
Taxa named by Edward Meyrick